Daniel Turcotte (born 25 June 1962) is a Canadian speed skater. He competed at the 1984 Winter Olympics and the 1988 Winter Olympics.

References

External links
 

1962 births
Living people
Canadian male speed skaters
Olympic speed skaters of Canada
Speed skaters at the 1984 Winter Olympics
Speed skaters at the 1988 Winter Olympics
People from Lachine, Quebec
Speed skaters from Montreal
20th-century Canadian people